Clostridium cochlearium is a bacterium from the genus Clostridium.

References

Bacteria described in 1919
cochlearium